Puente del Inca (English "Bridge of the Inca"), is a natural arch that forms a bridge over the Las Cuevas River, a tributary of the Mendoza River. The nearby hot springs are also named Puente del Inca.

While Puente del Inca has shown signs of deterioration, it remains stable under its weight under present conditions. Factors of safety ranging from 1.5 to 3.0 have been estimated for the arch.

Formation 
Both glaciers and the hot springs were involved in the formation of the arch. During an ice age, glaciers would have expanded down throughout the entire valley; then, at the end of the ice age when the Earth began to warm up again, the retreating ice would have left behind massive piles of eroded debris. The water that flows from the hot springs is extremely rich in mineral content, to the point that it has been known to petrify small objects in a layer of minerals. Similarly, the piles of debris left by the glaciers were encrusted over time into a single solid mass. Finally, during a period where the climate was extremely wet, a powerful river formed in the valley. It cut a channel through the lower, least encrusted layers of debris, which gradually eroded into the large opening of the arch.

History 

In March 1835, Charles Darwin visited the site, and made some drawings of the bridge with large stalactites.

In the early 20th century, a large thermal resort and monastery used the hot springs to treat certain illnesses. There is still a spa further down the river at Cacheuta. Tourists arrived by train at the resort, at a railway station that is still standing, though long abandoned. This was one of the last Argentine stations of the Transandine Railway before the train continued into Chile through a long tunnel under the Andes.

The area is located between the two trail-heads for climbing Aconcagua, the highest mountain in the western hemisphere.  The abandoned railway station has been turned into a mountaineering museum, "Museo del Andinista", founded by a group of mountain climbers from Rosario to display the cultural history of the area. The museum is open to the public during the summer and is run by the founding group of friends.

Geography and climate
This (continental) type of climate is extremely rare in both South America and the Southern Hemisphere at large, due to the scarcity of large landmasses in the extratropical southern latitudes. Puente del Inca achieves it due to its relatively large distance from its nearest ocean—; close enough to bring moisture to avoid having a cold semi-arid climate like the nearby Arid Diagonal but distant enough to increase the seasonal temperature variation—its leeward position in the Andes, and its high elevation reducing temperatures to well below that of the surrounding area. Nevertheless, its vegetation (notably lacking the typical hemiboreal or subalpine forests) is far more consistent with a cold semi-arid climate (BSk, according to Köppen).

Gallery

References

External links

  
argentinastravel.com: Puente del Inca in Mendoza, Argentina 
Pictures from Puente del Inca

Natural arches
Geology of Argentina
Landforms of Argentina
Landforms of Mendoza Province
Miocene
Protected areas of Mendoza Province